The 1996–97 FC Bayern Munich season saw the club clinch its 13th Bundesliga title.

Players

Squad, appearances and goals 

|}

Goals

Bookings

Transfers

In
First Team

Total spending:  €6.42m

Out
First Team

Total income:  €4.85m

Management and coaching staff

Results

Friendlies

FC Zürich Centenary Trophy

Fuji-Cup

Opel Master Cup

Bayern Munich was crowned champion due to goal difference.  All matches lasted 45 minutes.

Bundesliga

League table

Matches

Results by round

DFB Pokal

UEFA Cup 

Valencia won 3–1 on aggregate.

References

Sources
Soccerbase.com
kicker

FC Bayern Munich seasons
Bayern Munich
German football championship-winning seasons